Dick Young may refer to:

Dick Young (cricketer) (1885–1968), English Test cricketer
Dick Young (sportswriter) (1917–1987), American sportswriter
Dick Young (baseball) (1928–2018), American baseball player
Dick Young (footballer) (1939–1989), English footballer (Grimsby Town)
Dick Young (American football), American football player
Dick Young (coach), athletic director and baseball coach at Bowling Green State University
Dick Young (producer), Academy Award-nominated producer for Remember Me, It's the Same World, and Journey for Survival

See also
Richard Young (disambiguation)